John H. "Jack" Byrne (born 1946) is an American neuroscientist, is the Virgil and June Waggoner Chair of Neurobiology and Anatomy at McGovern Medical School in Houston, Texas.

Teaching 
John Byrne is the editor-in-chief for the Cold Spring Harbor Press journal Learning & Memory.

Honors, awards, and memberships 
 Elected Fellow, American Association for the Advancement of Science
The University of Texas System Regent's Teaching Award
 International Neural Network Society Hebb Award
 Dana Foundation
 Society for Neuroscience
 Chair, NIH Study Section on Learning, Memory and Decision Neuroscience

References 

1946 births
Living people
Polytechnic Institute of New York University alumni
American neuroscientists
University of Pittsburgh faculty
University of Texas Health Science Center at Houston faculty
Academic journal editors